Almagreira is a civil parish in the municipality of Pombal, Portugal.  The population in 2011 was 3,076, in an area of 43.18 km².

References

Parishes of Pombal, Portugal